United States v. South-Eastern Underwriters Association, 322 U.S. 533 (1944), is a United States Supreme Court case in which the Court held that the Sherman Act, the federal antitrust statute, applied to insurance. To reach this decision, the Court held that insurance could be regulated by the United States Congress under the Commerce Clause, overturning Paul v. Virginia. Congress responded by enacting the McCarran-Ferguson Act of 1945 which limited antitrust laws' applicability to the business and assured state authority would continue over insurance. 

In his partial dissent at 322 U.S. 588, Justice Robert H. Jackson of the Supreme Court said:

See also 
 United States corporate law

External links 

United States Constitution Article One case law
United States Supreme Court cases
United States antitrust case law
1944 in United States case law
United States Commerce Clause case law
United States Supreme Court cases of the Stone Court
Insurance in the United States